The Ecuadorian Civil War of 1912–1914 was a civil war fought in Ecuador in the 1910s. It began in 1913, when the Esmeraldas Province rose up against the rule of Leónidas Plaza. Ultimately, the government was able to re-assert control, though much of the province was destroyed in the process.  

While the authors of Resort to war: a data guide to inter-state, extra-state, intra-state, and non-state wars, 1816-2007 state that the war ended in 1914, Paul Henderson states that it ended in 1916.

References 

Military history of Ecuador
Conflicts in 1912
Conflicts in 1913
Conflicts in 1914
Wars involving Ecuador
1912 in Ecuador
1913 in Ecuador
1914 in Ecuador